James Evans (born October 13, 1950) is an American politician. He is a member of the Mississippi House of Representatives from the 70th District, being first elected in 1991. He is a member of the Democratic party.

References

1950 births
Living people
Democratic Party members of the Mississippi House of Representatives
People from Newton, Mississippi